William Quigley may refer to:

 William Quigley (artist) (born 1961), American painter
 William Quigley (coach) (1890–?), American college football player and coach
 William P. Quigley, law professor